The 1975 South Pacific Games, held in Guam from 1 to 10 August 1975, was the fifth edition of the South Pacific Games. A total of 1,205 athletes (907 men and 298 women) participated in a rain-affected games which had only one clear day out of the ten scheduled.

The hosting of the event, originally planned for 1974, had met trouble from the start. Carlos Camacho, the Governor of Guam, had been opposed to spending any government money on the games. The impasse was broken in late 1973 and the games were rescheduled for 1975. However, preparations for the events did not progress smoothly, and visiting teams were disappointed with the condition of some of the venues and the scheduling in the middle of the rainy season. The games went ahead despite the logistical problems. Sixteen South Pacific Games records were broken in the track and field athletics events alone.

Guam's basketball gold medal win by the men's team captained by Tony Susuico was the highlight of the Games for the hosting country.

Participating countries
Thirteen Pacific nations or territories competed at the Games:

Note: A number in parentheses indicates the size of a country's team (where known).

Sports
There were 16 sports contested at the 1975 South Pacific Games:

Note: A number in parentheses indicates how many medal events were contested in that sport (where known).

Medal table
New Caledonia topped the (unofficial) medal count.

Notes
 Team sizes were reported before the Games for several countries including: American Samoa, New Hebrides, and Papua New Guinea.

 Micronesia sent 97 athletes, with participants in athletics, basketball, boxing, golf, weightlifting, softball, swimming, table tennis, tennis, underwater fishing, and volleyball.

 Weightlifting: medals were awarded only for total lift in each weight class.

 The medal table as reported in Pacific Islands Monthly at the conclusion of the Games is used as the source here. An incomplete medal tally was published on the official Pacific Games Council webpage (as at May 2015). That tally did not include medals won by Tonga, Solomon Islands, Nauru, or the Trust Territory of Micronesia, but did list medals as being won by Cook Islands who did not attend the Games in 1975.

References

Sources

Pacific Games by year
South Pacific Games
South Pacific Games
 
South Pacific Games
International sports competitions hosted by Guam
South Pacific Games